Pengkalan Hulu (Jawi: ڤڠكالن هولو), formerly known as Kroh or Keroh, is a town and a mukim in Hulu Perak District, Perak, Malaysia, bordering Thailand and Kedah. The nearest town on the Thailand side is Betong in Yala province.

Although described as a border town, Pengkalan Hulu is 7 km from the actual Malaysia-Thailand border which is located at Bukit Berapit, where the Malaysian customs, immigration and quarantine station is located. The town is served by both Federal Route 76, which connects it to Gerik and Kuala Kangsar to the south and Baling in Kedah to the north, and Federal Route 77 which goes in a northeasterly direction to Bukit Berapit and onward to Betong.

It is located at a height of 380 m above sea level.

Demographics
Languages spoken here include Malay, Chinese, Tamil, and Thai. The main religions are Islam, Buddhism, Hinduism, and Christianity.. The population is largely Malay, with significant Chinese and Indian segments.

Government and politics

Pengkalan Hulu is also an autonomous sub-district (daerah kecil), consisting of the mukims of Pengkalan Hulu and nearby Belukar Semang.

In the Malaysian Parliament, Pengkalan Hulu is part of the Gerik parliamentary constituency.

Education

 Sekolah Kebangsaan kroh
 Sekolah Jenis Kebangsaan (Tamil) Pengkalan Hulu
 Sekolah Jenis Kebangsaan (Cina) Eok Kwan
 Sekolah Kebangsaan Bekuai
 Sekolah Kebangsaan Tasek
 Sekolah Kebangsaan Kuak Hulu
 Sekolah Kebangsaan Kuak Luar
 Sekolah Menengah Kebangsaan Pengkalan Hulu
 Sekolah Menengah Kebangsaan Tun Saban
 Maktab Rendah Sains Mara
 Pondok Madrasah AlLatiffiah (Pondok Pak Teh)
 Madrasah Al yusuffiah

Mosque 

 Masjid Jamek, Pekan Pengkalan Hulu 
 Masjid Al-Aula, Kampung Selarong
 Masjid Al-Ghufran, Felda Lepang Nenering
 Masjid Iskandari, Pekan Kroh, Jalan Tasek
 Masjid Iskandariah, Kampung Kuak Luar
 Masjid Air Panas, Kg.Air Panas
 Masjid Klian Intan, Kg.Klian Intan
 Masjid Al-Bakri, Kg.Kuak Hulu

Place of Interest

 Gunung Lang kuak hulu - recreation and view point.
 Hot Spring Pond
 Golf Course
 Black River Cascade
 Kuak Shoe Cascade
 Kuak Rainbow Cascade
 Gua Gendang (Caves of Drum)- a unique cave with underground stream situated in a nearby Siamese village called Kampung Tasek.
 Taman Tasik Pengkalan Hulu - a unique human made lake with nice view located near the town of Pengkalan Hulu.
 The Zone Free Duty Shopping Centre - Located near border of Thailand.
 Kelian Intan - Situated 20 km from Pengkalan Hulu town. Well known as the one of the Black Area in Malaysian history as a place for Communist Malaya Parties to hide. It is also connect Pengkalan Hulu town down south to Gerik Town.
 "Northgate" is a mixed commercial and industrial development by the Indonesia-Malaysia-Thailand (IMT-GT) Growth Triangle.

References

External links
 Google Maps link showing the Bukit Berapit customs, immigration and quarantine post (left) and the Thai checkpoint to the right.
 Portal Rasmi Pejabat Daerah dan Tanah Pengkalan Hulu

Hulu Perak District
Towns in Perak
Malaysia–Thailand border crossings
Mukims of Perak